Edward J. Haluska (August 18, 1916 – June 12, 2002) was a former Democratic member of the Pennsylvania House of Representatives.
 He died of pancreatic cancer in 2002.

References

Democratic Party members of the Pennsylvania House of Representatives
2002 deaths
1916 births
20th-century American politicians
People from Cambria County, Pennsylvania
Deaths from pancreatic cancer